Lokpal is a 2013 Indian Malayalam-language vigilante thriller film written by S. N. Swamy and directed by Joshiy. The film stars Mohanlal as chef Nandagopal who leads a double life with an alter ego named Lokpal, a vigilante fighting against corruption. Kavya Madhavan, Meera Nandan, Manoj K. Jayan, Thambi Ramaiah, and Sai Kumar plays supporting roles. The soundtrack was composed by Ratheesh Vegha. The film was released on 31 January 2013.

Plot

Chef Nandagopal, while publicly known as the chef of the popular Nandu's Food Court, is also 'Lokpal' (Peoples' Protector), who fights corruption. The film does a flashback to Nandagopal's backstory which involves "attempted murder, a juvenile home and unrequited love"

Cast

Production
The film is produced by S. L. Vimal kumar, Balan Vijayan and M. Vijayakumar, under the banner of Happy & Ruby Cinemas. The film was launched on 10 September 2012 with a pooja ceremony organised at the Holiday Inn Hotel in Kochi, India. The movie was filmed in Kochi.

Release
The film was released on 31 January 2013 in 80 screens across Kerala. The distribution rights for Lokpal were bought by Maxlab Cinemas and Entertainments. Lokpal's premiere was held on 22 January 2013 in Kalabhavan theatre, Trivandrum, Kerala.

Critical reception

The film received negative reviews from critics. Paresh C Palicha of Rediff gave the movie 1.8/5, commenting that "It is hard to believe that Lokpal is the work of the director Joshiy who has given some good films in the past, which is a huge letdown." Moviebuzz of Sify gave the movie a verdict of "Pathetic", stating that "Lokpal is the kind of film that has been made with some kind of arrogance, without even scant regard for the viewer. Watch some of the yesteryear gems from Mohanlal instead of wasting time on this one." Unni R Nair of Kerala9 gave the movie 2/5, saying that "Lokpal is unimpressive, just because the script plays foil. Is watchable for the sake of Mohanlal." Parvathy Nair of SansCinema gave the movie 1/4, commenting that "Lokpal is a missed opportunity, with the only highlight being the presence and performance of Mohanlal."

Soundtrack

The soundtrack was composed by Ratheesh Vegha, with lyrics by Rafeeq Ahmed. The album consists of six songs and was launched on 26 January 2013 at Kochi. The event was attended by Mohanlal, Joshiy, Ratheesh Vegha, Kavya Madhavan, Manoj K. Jayan, Meera Nandan along with the technical crew and cast of Lokpal.

References

External links
 
 Lokpal at the Malayalam Online Movie Database

2013 films
2010s Malayalam-language films
2010s political thriller films
2010s vigilante films
Indian vigilante films
Indian political thriller films
Films about corruption in India
Films shot in Kochi
Fictional portrayals of the Kerala Police
Films directed by Joshiy